The Old Brahmaputra River is a distributary of the Brahmaputra River in north-central Bangladesh.  Historically the main stem of the Brahmaputra, the larger river's primary outflow was redirected via the Jamuna River after the 1762 Arakan earthquake.  Today, the Old Brahmaputra has been relegated to a minor river with much less flow than its former self.  The river branches off from the Brahmaputra in Jamalpur District and flows southeasterly for approximately  before meeting the Meghna River in Kishoreganj District.

References

Rivers of Bangladesh
Rivers of Mymensingh Division
Rivers of Dhaka Division